Snub TV (also known as simply Snub) was an alternative culture television program that aired from 1987 to 1989 as a segment on the Night Flight overnight programming on the USA Network, and subsequently for three seasons on the BBC.

Production

The original US program was developed by executive producer Fran Duffy and aired as part of Nightflight on a fortnightly basis. The first two seasons were produced in the UK by Pete Fowler and Brenda Kelly. A third season was produced in the US by Duffy with help from Giorgio Gomelsky.

In 1989-1991 a UK version, produced by Fowler and Kelly, aired for three seasons on the BBC, and was syndicated to the pan-European TV channel Super Channel and in other countries in Europe, such as Russia, Portugal, Denmark and Greece.

Content
Snub early focus on emphasis on the indie and underground music scene in the UK was very much informed by Kelly's position as editor of The Catalogue, house magazine of The Cartel record distribution group, plus Fowler's work producing videos for bands. As the BBC show developed the program covered the rise of Madchester documenting such as The Stone Roses. The British series also featured other acts such as comedians.

Influence
Snub TV has been credited with giving many then-new bands and musical acts initial or early television exposure vital to their careers.

Archive release
In 2017 Fowler stated that plans to release a complete archive had been shelved due to lack of funds.

References

External links
 Ian Jones: "Everyone Must Be Young and Beautiful": DEF II Revisited—Part One: "I Want to Subvert Mainstream TV" (October 2001) (includes brief interview with Fowler, bottom of page 1)
 Daniel Dylan Wray: Snub TV: cult music show that unearthed the underground (The Guardian) 6 June 2017

BBC Television shows
1980s British music television series
1987 British television series debuts
1989 British television series endings